Perth Glory FC has entered a women's soccer team in the Australian A-League Women competition since the league's founding as the W-League in 2008. , Shannon May, with 120 appearances, has played the most league matches for Perth Glory. In 2018, she became the first Glory player to reach 100 matches.

List

B
Carla Bennett
 Nicola Bolger
 Danielle Brogan

C
 Kim Carroll
 Sarah Carroll
 Ciara Conway
 Katy Coghlan

D
 Gabrielle Dal Busco
 Lisa De Vanna
 Vanessa DiBernardo
 Maya Diederichsen
 Jessica Dillon
 Elisa D'Ovidio
 Emily J Dunn

F
 Caitlin Foord
 Amanda Frisbie

G
 Kate Gill

H
 Carys Hawkins
 Emily Henderson
 Rachel Hill
 Katie Holtham

J
 Chantel Jones
 Katarina Jukic
 Christina Julien

K
 Alanna Kennedy
 Sam Kerr
 Amy Knights

L
 Stacey Learmont
 Shiya Lim
 Aivi Luik

M
 Shannon May
 Melissa Maizels
 Ella Mastrantonio
 Alyssa Mautz
 Collette McCallum
 Luisa Marzotto
 Elizabeth Milne

O
 Tanya Oxtoby

P
 Zoe Palandri

R
 Raquel Rodríguez
 Arianna Romero

S
 Cecilie Sandvej
 Elle Semmens
 Alex Singer
 Rachael Smith
 Nikki Stanton
 Rosie Sutton

T
 Marianna Tabain

W
 Emma Wirkus

Z
 Shelina Zadorsky

References

Perth Glory FC W-League players
 
Association football player non-biographical articles
Perth Glory